The following highways are numbered 387:

Japan
 Japan National Route 387

United States
  Arizona State Route 387
  Georgia State Route 387 (former)
  Louisiana Highway 387 (former)
  Maryland Route 387
  New York State Route 387
  Puerto Rico Highway 387
  South Carolina Highway 387 (former)
  Tennessee State Route 387
  Virginia State Route 387
  Wyoming Highway 387